Hamlet (also referred to as The Black Album) is the sixth album by Spanish metal band Hamlet. The sound of this CD is more aggressive than El Inferno album. This is the last studio album with bass player Augusto Hernández. It was produced and mixed by Colin Richardson and mastered by Tom Barket at Precision Mastering (Los Angeles).

Track listing
Limítate	
Queda Mucho Por Hacer 	
Vivo En Él 	
No Lo Entiendo 	
El Disfraz 	
Versus 	
Mira Hacia Atrás 	
Acuérdate De Mi 	
Ni Un Solo Instante	
Esperaré En El Infierno 	
Desorden

Members 
J. Molly - vocals
Luis Tárraga - lead guitar
Pedro Sánchez - rhythm guitar
Augusto Hernández - bass, chorus
Paco Sánchez - drums

Sources 
Info about the album
Review on zona-zero

2002 albums
Hamlet (band) albums
Locomotive Music albums
Albums recorded at Sonic Ranch